Liuliqiao may refer to:
Places in Beijing
Liuliqiao (old bridge), 6 li out of Guang'anmen, and the source of names below.
Liuliqiao Village, a village beside the old bridge.
Liuliqiao Station, a subway station beside Liuliqiao Village.
Liuliqiao (area), area around the old bridge.
Liuliqiao (flyover), a flyover in Liuliqiao area, situated on 3rd Ring Road.
Liuliqiao transportation junction, a transportation junction in Liuliqiao area, situated at the northeast corner of the flyover.